Cobus Grobbelaar (born 27 May 1981) is a former South African rugby union footballer. His regular playing position was flanker. He represented the Lions in Super Rugby and the Golden Lions in the Currie Cup until his retirement in 2012.

External links

Lions rugby
itsrugby.co.uk profile

Living people
1981 births
Afrikaner people
South African rugby union players
Golden Lions players
Lions (United Rugby Championship) players
Rugby union flankers
South African people of Danish descent
South African people of Dutch descent
South African people of German descent
Rugby union players from Johannesburg